Route 9 is a highway in the Kansas City, Missouri area.  Its northern terminus is at Interstate 29/U.S. Route 71 in Kansas City North; its southern terminus is at Interstate 35/Interstate 70/U.S. Route 24/U.S. Route 40 in downtown Kansas City.  Even though both termini are in Kansas City, it passes through other towns and cities.  It is carried across the Missouri River by the Heart of America Bridge between downtown Kansas City, Missouri and North Kansas City, Missouri.  In North Kansas City, the highway serves as a main thoroughfare, Burlington Street.

History
Route 9 was created in 1922 as Route 59 and was renumbered in the early 1930s when US 59 entered Missouri.

Junction list

References

External links

009
Transportation in Platte County, Missouri
Transportation in Clay County, Missouri
Transportation in Jackson County, Missouri